Horace Fort Jayne (5 March 1859, Philadelphia, Pennsylvania – 9 July 1913, Wallingford, Pennsylvania) was an American zoölogist and educator.

Biography
He was educated at the University of Pennsylvania (A.B., 1879; M.D., 1882), and studied biology at the universities of Leipzig and Jena in 1882–1883, and at Johns Hopkins for a year. In 1884 he was appointed professor of vertebrate morphology at The Wistar Institute of Anatomy and Biology, and became a director of the institute. He was a professor of zoölogy at the University of Pennsylvania from 1894 to 1905, secretary of Penn's biological faculty (1884–1889), and dean of Penn's college faculty (1889–1894). He became a trustee of Drexel Institute, and served as co-editor of several scientific journals. In 1885, he was elected as a member of the American Philosophical Society.

He married ethnologist Caroline Furness Jayne (1873–1909), and they had two children. Their son, Horace H. F. Jayne (1898–1975), became the first curator of Chinese art at the Philadelphia Museum of Art, and later was director of the University of Pennsylvania Museum of Archaeology and Anthropology, and vice director of the Metropolitan Museum of Art.

Works
Abnormalities Observed in the North American Coleoptera (1880)
Revision of the Dermestidœ of North America (1882)
Mammalian Anatomy (1898)
He was also the author of many scientific papers.

See also
Horace Jayne House
Lindenshade (Wallingford, Pennsylvania)

References

1859 births
1913 deaths
Burials at Laurel Hill Cemetery (Philadelphia)
Furness family
Perelman School of Medicine at the University of Pennsylvania alumni
University of Pennsylvania faculty
University of Pennsylvania Department of Biology faculty
Educators from Philadelphia
American zoologists
American science writers
Members of the American Philosophical Society